Dortmund-Derne station is a railway station in the Derne district of the town of Dortmund, located in North Rhine-Westphalia, Germany.

Rail services

References

Railway stations in Dortmund
Railway stations in Germany opened in 1874
1874 establishments in Prussia